Noam Weinstein (no-ahm wyne-styne) is an American singer-songwriter and musician. He is best known for his studio recordings and his collaborations with other artists such as Mike Viola, Heather Masse, Sam Sadigursky, and Norah Jones.

Biography
Noam Weinstein grew up in Cambridge, Massachusetts and began playing guitar as a child and performing at local clubs during high school. In 1999 he moved to New York City and joined the Greenwich Village songwriting community led by Jack Hardy. From 2001-2014 he released seven albums (six studio projects and one recorded live at The Living Room); an eighth, the compilation Sixteen Skies, was distributed in Europe.

Recent Work
Weinstein's 2022 release, Undivorceable, is a suite of new songs about "the bonds that can't be broken, whether between a husband and his former wife (Imperfectly Still), a father and his children (The Kind of Love) or a citizen and his skin color (Jackpot)." The Daily Vault called it "a captivating listen, both devastatingly honest and immensely tuneful." It was produced by Mike Viola, recorded by Pierre de Reeder, mastered by Eric Boulanger, and performed with a band including drummer Abe Rounds, bassist Jonny Flaugher, and keyboard player Lee Pardini. Some of the songs also feature a string section arranged by Trey Pollard. (Weinstein sings and plays piano.)

His previous project, 2020's 42 1/2, was "inspired by that magical time when both the wild innocence of a 42-year-old and the sober wisdom of a 43-year-old are just out of reach." Rolling Stone Germany described it as "folk-pop masterpieces". Prior to that, 2016's On Waves celebrated "cycles, storms, mystery channels, and the beats beyond." The Daily Vault said it was "heart-wrenching," "dazzling with its musical audacity," and "genuinely moving," while Popdose wrote that it was "terrific", and No Depression called it "catchy", "heartfelt", "hilarious" and "beautiful".

Recognition
Although lesser known than many of his collaborators, Weinstein has received critical acclaim in publications like Performing Songwriter, The New Yorker, and The Boston Globe, and airplay on prominent independent radio stations such as WFUV, WXPN, and WERS. His song "Fragile" was recorded by Norah Jones and included on the reissue of her debut album, Come Away With Me, while "I Can Hurt People" was featured on the Showtime series Weeds, and several others have been recorded by indie artists such as Mieka Pauley, Greta Gertler, Mark Whitaker, Jess Tardy, and Lin McEwan. Noam is also a three-time finalist in the USA Songwriting Competition.

Discography

As Leader
 Enough About You (2001)
 Above The Music (2002)
 Probably Human (2004)
 We're All Going There (2006)
 Sixteen Skies (2009)
 Found Alive (2010)
 Clocked (2012)
 Bottlefed (2014)
 On Waves (2016)
 42 1/2 (2020)
 Undivorceable (2022)

As Guest
 Jess Tardy, Waiting For You (2002)
 Greta Gertler, The Baby That Brought Bad Weather (2003)
 The Great Unknowns, Presenting The Great Unknowns (2004)
 Naomi Sommers, Gentle as The Sun (2008)
 Sam Sadigursky, Words (2009)

References

American male singer-songwriters
1977 births
Living people
Musicians from Cambridge, Massachusetts
American male guitarists
American performance artists
Guitarists from Massachusetts
21st-century American singers
21st-century American guitarists
21st-century American male singers
Singer-songwriters from Massachusetts